The Mobile Ground-to-Air Radar Jamming System (MGARJS) provides electronic warfare field support capability to protect high-value targets and installations.

The MGARJS consists of mobile stations placed strategically about high-value installations. The exact complement of station types and quantities is tailored to the mission requirements. An electronic support measures subsystem provides initial interception and tracking of the target radar systems and commands the electronic countermeasure subsystems to track and jam airborne radar systems. The system is configured to minimize activation time.

A mobile field maintenance station provides support to other stations and also can act as a communication relay node if the deployment scenario requires.

The system provides:

Air surveillance, acquisition, and analysis of airborne radar systems
Directed electronic countermeasures to deny the effective use of those radar systems
Radar track integration with air defense networks

See also
Electronic warfare support measures (ESM)

External links
ATK - International Products - MGARJS

Electronic countermeasures